Tejas Bakre (born 12 May 1981, Ahmadabad, India) is an Indian Chess Champion. He acquire Fide Master (FM) title in 1997 and International Master (IM) title in 1999. In 2014, he got Grandmaster (GM) norm by defeating IM Adam Horvath of Hungary in the 11th round to top the table with 8 points in Budapest. He was first GM of Gujarat, India. He is Professional Chess Coach and FIDE Trainer (2014).

Notable Tournaments

References 

1981 births
Living people
Indian chess players
Chess grandmasters